Mokriany is a village in Drohobych Raion, Lviv Oblast, Ukraine. It belongs to Boryslav urban hromada, one of the hromadas of Ukraine. The zip code is 82125. It was founded in 1515 and currently has a population of 383.

References

External links
 Mokriany

Villages in Drohobych Raion